WSR-57 radars were the USA's main weather surveillance radar for over 35 years.  The National Weather Service operated a network of this model radar across the country, watching for severe weather.

History

The WSR-57 (Weather Surveillance Radar - 1957) was the first 'modern' weather radar. Initially commissioned at the Miami Hurricane Forecast Center, the WSR-57 was installed in other parts of the CONUS (continental United States).  The WSR-57 was the first generation of radars designed expressly for a national warning network.

The WSR-57 was designed in 1957 by Dewey Soltow using World War II technology.  It gave only coarse reflectivity data and no velocity data, which made it extremely difficult to predict tornadoes.  Weather systems were traced across the radar screen using grease pencils.  Forecasters had to manually turn a crank to adjust the radar's scan elevation, and needed considerable skill to judge the intensity of storms based on green blotches on the radar scope.

The military designation for the WSR-57 is AN/FPS-41.

NOAA has pictures of the Charleston, SC, WSR-57 radar image of the 1989 Hurricane Hugo. A WSR-57 dish, located on the roof of the National Hurricane Center (NHC), was blown away by Hurricane Andrew. The NHC report on Hurricane Andrew shows its last radar image, as well as images from nearby WSR-88D radars. As the network of WSR-57 radars aged, some were replaced with WSR-74S models of similar performance but with better reliability.  WSR-57 operators sometimes had to scramble for spare parts no longer manufactured in this country.  128 of the WSR-57 and WSR-74 model radars were spread across the country as the National Weather Service's radar network until the 1990s.  The WSR-57 radars were gradually replaced by the Weather Surveillance Radar - 1988, Doppler, WSR-88D, which NOAA named the NEXRAD network.

The last WSR-57 radar in the United States was decommissioned on December 2, 1996.

Radar sites

The 66 former sites of the WSR-57 include the following:

Radar properties

 The radar uses a wavelength of 10.3 cm.  This corresponds to an operating frequency of 2890 MHz. This frequency is in the S band, which is also used by today's weather radar network.
 WSR-57 radars had the following interesting statistics:
 Dish diameter: 
 Power output: 410,000 watts
 Maximum range: 915 km (494 nm)

References

National Weather Service weather radars
1957 meteorology
Radars of the United States Air Force
Military electronics of the United States
Military equipment introduced in the 1950s